Saxen is a municipality in the district of Perg in the Austrian state of Upper Austria.

Geography
Saxen lies in the eastern Machland on the Danube. About 24 percent of the municipality is forest, and 58 percent is farmland.

Population

References

Cities and towns in Perg District